Justice Cox may refer to:

Charles E. Cox (1860–1936), associate justice and chief justice of the Indiana Supreme Court
Frank Cox (judge) (1862–1940), associate justice of the Supreme Court of Appeals of West Virginia
Joseph Winston Cox (1875–1939), associate justice of the District Court of the United States for the District of Columbia
Louis Cox (1874–1961), associate justice of the Massachusetts Supreme Judicial Court
W. H. Lionel Cox (1844–1921), chief justice of the Straits Settlements